Shabana Football Club, more commonly known as simply Shabana or sometimes Shabana Kisii, is a FKF Premier League club based in Kisii. The club was formed in 1980 by Kisii based businessman Dogo Khan.  They won the division title in 2014.They were promoted back to the FKF Premier League after winning the Zone B  of the FKF Division One. It had nearly collapsed in 2006 when a dispute over its relegation from the Kenyan Premier League. They were set to play in Nationwide League, the second level tier in Kenya, but refused to participate insisting they belong to the Premier League (who did not readmit them). As a result, the club did not participate any league in 2007. However the team regrouped and was renamed Gusii United Football Club, eventually returning to league football. Their home stadium is Gusii Stadium.On 28 October 2018, Shabana was upgraded to Kenya's second largest league The Kenya National Super League after defeating Mwatate on penalties the game that went full time 1-1 at Kasarani Stadium Nairobi.
On 28 November 2018 Gilbert Selebwa was appointed head coach, assisted by Kanuli Rix

History

Crest and Colours

Grounds

GUSII STADIUM

Shabana is the third community club, therefore, it is the third club in Kenya with most supporters after Gor Mahia and AFC Leopards.

Global brand

Ownership and finances

Current squad

Performance in CAF competitions
 African Cup of Champions Clubs: 1 appearance
1988: First Round.

References

Association football clubs established in 1980
Kenyan National Super League clubs
FKF Division One clubs
Sport in Nyanza Province
Football clubs in Kenya
1980 establishments in Kenya